Félix Antonio Sánchez (born August 3, 1981) is a former Major League Baseball pitcher who played in the major leagues briefly with the Chicago Cubs as a September callup in 2003.

He appeared in 3 games and gave up 2 earned runs. On April 29, 2004, he was traded to the Detroit Tigers and spent the rest of the season with Double-A Erie. In 2005, he played for the High-A Lakeland Tigers in what would be his last professional season.

References

External links

1981 births
Living people
Arizona League Cubs players
Boise Hawks players
Chicago Cubs players
Dominican Republic expatriate baseball players in the United States
Erie SeaWolves players
Lakeland Tigers players
Lancaster JetHawks players
Lansing Lugnuts players

Major League Baseball pitchers
Major League Baseball players from the Dominican Republic
People from Puerto Plata, Dominican Republic
West Tennessee Diamond Jaxx players